Patrick Walker may refer to:

 Patric Walker (1931–1995), American-born British astrologer
 Patrick Walker (executive), British media executive
 Sir Patrick Walker (MI5 officer) (1932–2021), director general of MI5 1988–1991
 Patrick Gordon Walker (1907–1980), British politician
 Pat Walker (born 1959), Irish football manager and former player
 Patrick Walker, British musician, Warning lead singer and guitarist
 Pat Walker (rugby league) (born 1986), English rugby league player